In law, the duty to retreat, or requirement of safe retreat, is a legal requirement in some jurisdictions that a threatened person cannot harm another in self-defense (especially lethal force) when it is possible to instead retreat to a place of safety. This requirement contrasts with the right in some other jurisdictions to stand one's ground, meaning being allowed to defend one's self instead of retreating.

It is a specific component which sometimes appears in the criminal defense of self-defense, and which must be addressed if criminal defendants are to prove that their conduct was justified.

United States law
Most U.S. jurisdictions have a stand-your-ground law or apply what is known as the castle doctrine, whereby a threatened person need not retreat within his or her own dwelling or place of work. Sometimes this has been the result of court rulings that one need not retreat in a place where one has a special right to be. In other states, this has been accomplished by statute, such as that suggested by the Model Penal Code.

In Erwin v. State (1876), the Supreme Court of Ohio wrote that a "true man", one without fault, would not retreat. In Runyan v. State (1877), the Indiana court rejected a duty to retreat, saying, "the tendency of the American mind seems to be very strongly against" a duty to retreat. The court went further in saying that no statutory law could require a duty to retreat, because the right to stand one's ground is "founded on the law of nature; and is not, nor can be, superseded by any law of society."

English law
In English law the focus of the test is whether the defendant is acting reasonably in the particular situation. There is no specific requirement that a person must retreat in anticipation of an attack. Although some withdrawal would be useful evidence to prove that the defendant did not want to fight, not every defendant is able to escape. In R v Bird the defendant was physically attacked, and reacted instinctively and immediately without having the opportunity to retreat. Had there been a delay in the response, the reaction might have appeared more revenge than self-defense.

Carrying weapons
As to carrying weapons in anticipation of an attack, Evans v Hughes held that for a defendant to justify his possession of a metal bar on a public highway, he had to show that there was an imminent particular threat affecting the particular circumstances in which the weapon was carried.  Similarly, in Taylor v Mucklow a building owner was held to be using an unreasonable degree of force in carrying a loaded airgun against a builder who was demolishing a new extension because his bills were unpaid. More dramatically, in AG's Reference (No 2 of 1983) Lord Lane held that a defendant who manufactured ten petrol bombs to defend his shop during the Toxteth riots could set up the defense of showing that he possessed an explosive substance "for a lawful purpose" if he could establish that he was acting in self-defense to protect himself or his family or property against an imminent and apprehended attack by means which he believed to be no more than reasonably necessary to meet the attack.

See also
Castle doctrine in the United States
Stand-your-ground law
Trespasser

References

Further reading

Brown, Richard Maxwell (1991). No Duty to Retreat: Violence and Values in American History and Society. (New York: Oxford University Press).

Suk, Jeannie. (2009). At Home in the Law: How the Domestic Violence Revolution is Transforming Privacy. (New Haven: Yale University Press).

Criminal defenses
Legal doctrines and principles